Edmund is an English masculine given name.

Edmund may also refer to:

 Edmund, South Carolina, United States, a census-designated place
 Edmund, Wisconsin, United States, an unincorporated community
 Edmund Scientific Corporation, an American company supplying optics and other scientific items
 , cargo ship that sank on Lake Superior in the 1970s

See also
 
Edmond (disambiguation)
Edmunds (disambiguation)